"Out of Touch" is a song by American singer Dove Cameron, released on December 6, 2019, through Disruptor and Columbia Records.

Background 
Cameron announced the song's release on December 2, 2019, by posting a picture on social media of a file titled "Out of Touch Explicit (Mastered)" with the caption "12/6". She teased the song the following day posting a picture on social media with handwritten lyrics of the song. Cameron called the song "One of her favourite tracks she has done so far". It was one of the first songs she recorded for her "new music era".

Composition 
"Out of Touch" is a pop-rock song above a "mellow, mid-tempo guitar riff". The song was written in the key of B Major with a tempo of 80 beats per minute. The song is about Cameron "recovering from a tiff with her lover and how she hopes to reconcile" and "wanting this person to keep being honest with her, even when she doesn't handle it well".

Music video 
The music video accompanied the song's release. It sees Cameron singing to the camera on a rooftop with a city setting in the background. At the end of the video, Cameron runs into the arms of her partner Thomas Doherty.

Credits and personnel 
Credits adapted from Tidal.

 Dove Cameron – songwriting, vocals
 DallasK – songwriting, production
 Halatrax – songwriting, production
 John Thomas Roach – songwriting
 Kevin Robert Fisher – songwriting
 Lisa Scinta – songwriting
 Steph Jones – songwriting
 Keith Parry – assistant engineering
 Chris Gehringer – mastering
 Erik Madrid – mixing
 Jenna Andrews – recording

Release history

References 

2018 songs
2019 singles
Columbia Records singles
Disruptor Records singles
Dove Cameron songs
Songs written by DallasK
Songs written by Dove Cameron
Songs written by Steph Jones